Torgeir Anderssen-Rysst (9 August 1888 – 1958) was a Norwegian politician for the Liberal Party. 

Torgeir Anderssen-Rysst was born at Ålesund in Møre og Romsdal, Norway. A lawyer by profession, he worked as editor of Sunnmørsposten from 1918 to 1928, and again in 1931 and 1934. He served as Minister of Defence in the second government of Johan Mowinckel 1928–1931. Anderssen-Rysst later worked as a tax collector in Ålesund, and served as ambassador to Iceland, remaining in that post until his death. He was also a reserve officer in the Norwegian Army.

References

External links

1888 births
1958 deaths
People from Møre og Romsdal
Politicians from Ålesund
Liberal Party (Norway) politicians
Tax collectors
Norwegian Army personnel of World War II
Defence ministers of Norway